The Lake Placid Olympic Sports Complex is a winter sports complex located at the foot of Mount Van Hoevenberg near Lake Placid, New York. Part of the Olympic Regional Development Authority (ORDA), it was created following the 1980 Winter Olympics.

The complex includes a bobsleigh, luge, and skeleton track along with trails for both biathlon and cross-country skiing.

Venues

Bobsleigh, luge, and skeleton track

Constructed in 1930 for the 1932 Winter Olympics, the track was the first bobsleigh track located outside of Europe. In 1949, it hosted the FIBT World Championships, also the first outside of Europe. The original bobsleigh track was demolished in 1978 to pave the way for an artificial track for the 1980 Winter Olympics with a separate luge track being constructed for those same games. The luge track was the first luge track in North America when it was completed in 1979. In 1983, the luge track was the first venue to host the FIL World Luge Championships outside of Europe. Both tracks were demolished in the late 1990s and a combination track was constructed in early 2000 in time for the only Winter Goodwill Games. The track is a regular venue for World Cup competitions in bobsleigh, luge, and skeleton. In 2009, the track will become the first combination track to host the bobsleigh, luge, and skeleton world championships in a non-Winter Olympic year.

The current track is 1455 meters long with 20 curves and an average grade of 9.8%.

Cross country and biathlon center  

The complex is home to the Lake Placid Olympic Sports Complex Cross Country Biathlon Center.

Events

Annual Events 
Winter Empire State Games

Notable Events  
Winter Olympics: 1932, 1980
Winter Universiade: 1972
Winter Goodwill Games: 2000
Biathlon World Cup: 1979-80, 1986-87
Biathlon World Championships: 1973, 1987
FIBT World Championships: 1949, 1961, 1969, 1973, 1978, 1983, 1997 (men's skeleton), 2003 (Men's bobsleigh), 2009, 2012
FIL World Luge Championships: 1983, 2009

References
Information on complex.

Venues of the 1980 Winter Olympics
Sports venues in New York (state)
Sports venues in Essex County, New York
Olympic Parks